Adéane is a small town and rural community in Senegal. It has a population of 2115 people according to the 2002 census. It lies on the southern bank of the Casamance River, opposite where the Soungrougrou River joins the Casamance, in close proximity to the Bissine Forest. It lies along the N6 highway, connecting it to Ziguinchor and Kolda.

Geography

Villages
Villages in the Adéane rural community comprise
 Adéane
 Agnack Grand
 Agnack Petit
 Baghagha
 Bissine
 Diagnon
 Koundioundou
 Sindone
 Tambacoumba

References

Rural communities of Senegal
Populated places in the Ziguinchor Department